This article lists some of the attested Gaelic kingdoms of Early Medieval Ireland prior to the Norman invasion of 1169-72.

For much of this period, the island was divided into numerous clan territories and kingdoms (known as túatha). These túatha often competed for control of resources and thus they continually grew and shrank (in both size and number). In addition to kingdoms or túatha, Gaelic Ireland was also divided into five prime overkingdoms (Old Irish cóiceda, Modern Irish cúige). These were Ulaid (in the north), Connacht (in the west), Laighin (in the southeast), Mumhan (in the south) and Mide (in the centre).

After the Norman invasion, much of the island came under the control of the Lordship of Ireland, although some parts remained under the control of Gaelic dynasties. After 1350, Norman control began to weaken, and a "Gaelic resurgence"
took place which resulted in the direct influence of the Parliament of Ireland shrinking to an area known as The Pale by 1500. In 1541 the Kingdom of Ireland was established by Henry VIII and the Tudor conquest of Ireland commenced. The repudiation of the terms of the Treaty of Mellifont by the Crown resulted in the Nine Years War and Flight of the Earls, which marked the end of the Gaelic order.

Ulster

Earliest times
Darini, in Tyrone, Armagh and Down, possibly a branch of the Érainn and linked with their supposed ancestor deity Dáire
Erdini in County Fermanagh
Robogdii, in Antrim and Londonderry
Venicnii in County Donegal
Voluntii, probably the people later known as the Ulaid, in Armagh, Down, Monaghan and Cavan

Early Christian
Airgíalla or Oirghialla or Oriel
Airthir
 Cairpre Droma Cliab
Cenél Conaill (Tir Chonaill)
Cenél nEogain (Tir Eogain)
Conaille Muirtheimne
Cruithne
Dál nAraidi
Dál Fiatach
Dál Riata
Dartraige
Dartraige Con-innsi
Eilne
Fir Manach
Iveagh
Uí Echach Cobo
Northern Uí Néill
Ulaid

From the 12th century
East Breifne

Meath

Earliest times
Ebdani, Eblani or Blanii (probably variants of the same name)

Early Christian
Ciannachta
Southern Uí Néill
Brega
Lagore
Cnogba

Leinster

Earliest times
Brigantes in south Wexford, also known from northern Britain; possibly linked with the goddess Brigit
Cauci around Dublin
Coriondi north Wexford
Menapii in County Wicklow, also known from Gaul; their name is linked to Fermanagh and Monaghan, although they are much further north
Osraige

Early Christian
Kingdom of Dublin
Uí Ceinnselaig 
Uí Dúnlainge

From the 12th century
Kingdom of Leinster, see also Kings of Leinster.

Munster

Earliest times

Gangani or Concani in Counties Limerick and Clare; also lived in Wales - Ptolemy calls the Llŷn Peninsula the "Promontory of the Gangani"
Iverni in County Cork, later known as the Érainn
Luceni in Counties Kerry and Limerick
Usdiae, Udiae or Vodiae in Counties Waterford and Cork, possibly related to the later Osraige
Uterni in Cork
Vellabori or Velabri in Kerry

Early Christian
Builg
Corcu Baiscind
Corcu Duibne
Corcu Loígde
Dáirine
Dál gCais
Deirgtine
Déisi
Eóganachta
Érainn
Iarmuman
Mairtine
Múscraige
Uí Fidgenti
Uí Liatháin

From the 12th century
Kingdom of Desmond

Connacht

Earliest times
Auteini in County Galway, identified with the later Uaithne
Nagnatae in County Mayo and County Sligo, possibly linked with the Ol nÉcmacht; Cóiced Ol nEchmacht was an ancient name for Connacht.

Early Christian
Aidhne or Uí Fiachrach Aidhne
Breifne
Conmaicne Mara
Connachta
Corco Moga
Delbhna
Delbhna Nuadat
Delbhna Tir Dha Locha
Fir Domnann (aka Irrus Domnann)
Hy Briuin Ai
Hy Diarmata
Hy Fiachrach Aidhne
Hy Fiachrach Fionn
Hy Fiachrach Muaidhe
Hy-Many
Iar Connacht
Kinela
Moylurg
Muintir Murchada
Partraige
Síol Anmchadha
Síol Muirdeach
Soghan
Tyrconnell
Uí Fiachrach

From the 12th century
Clanricarde
Mac William Íochtar
West Breifne

See also
Irish nobility
List of Irish tribes/clans
MacDunleavy (dynasty)
Monarchy of Ireland
O'Donnell dynasty

References

Bhreathnach, Edel (ed.), The Kingship and Landscape of Tara. Four Courts Press for The Discovery Programme. 2005.
Byrne, Francis J., Irish Kings and High-Kings. Four Courts Press. 3rd edition, 2001.
Charles-Edwards, T.M., Early Christian Ireland. Cambridge University Press. 2000.
Curley, Walter J.P., Vanishing Kingdoms: The Irish Chiefs and their Families. Dublin: Lilliput Press. 2004.
Dillon, Myles, The Cycles of the Kings. Oxford. 1946. / Four Courts Press. Revised edition, 1995.
Duffy, Seán (ed.), Medieval Ireland: An Encyclopedia. Routledge. 2005.
Keating, Geoffrey, with David Comyn and Patrick S. Dinneen (trans.), The History of Ireland by Geoffrey Keating. 4 Vols. London: David Nutt for the Irish Texts Society. 1902-14.
MacKillop, James, A Dictionary of Celtic Mythology. Oxford. 1998.
Koch, John T. (ed.), Celtic Culture: A Historical Encyclopedia. 5 volumes or single ebook. ABC-CLIO. 2006.
Lalor, Brian, The Encyclopedia of Ireland. Yale University Press. 2003.
Mac Niocaill, Gearóid, Ireland before the Vikings. Dublin: Gill and Macmillan. 1972.
Meyer, Kuno (ed.), "The Laud Genealogies and Tribal Histories", in Zeitschrift für Celtische Philologie 8. Halle/Saale, Max Niemeyer. 1912. Pages 291-338.
Ó Corráin, Donnchadh (ed.), Genealogies from Rawlinson B 502 University College, Cork: Corpus of Electronic Texts. 1997.
Ó Corráin, Donnchadh, Ireland before the Normans. Dublin: Gill and Macmillan. 1972.
O'Donovan, John (ed. and tr.), Annála Ríoghachta Éireann. Annals of the Kingdom of Ireland by the Four Masters, from the Earliest Period to the Year 1616. 7 vols. Royal Irish Academy. Dublin. 1848-51. 2nd edition, 1856.
O'Rahilly, Thomas F., Early Irish History and Mythology. Dublin Institute for Advanced Studies. 1946.
Rynne, Etienne (ed.), North Munster Studies: Essays in Commemoration of Monsignor Michael Moloney. Limerick. 1967.
Sproule, David, "Origins of the Éoganachta", in Ériu 35 (1984): pp. 31–37.

External links
Ancient Kings, Kingdoms, and Territories of Ireland
Ptolemy's Geography of Ireland

 
Kingdoms
Irish kingdoms